The 1975 Australian Touring Car Championship was a CAMS sanctioned Australian motor racing title open to Group C Touring Cars. The championship began at Symmons Plains and ended at Lakeside after seven rounds. It was the 16th Australian Touring Car Championship.

The Championship was won by Colin Bond driving a Holden Torana.

The 1975 championship was one of the most controversial in the history of the title with series leader Allan Grice disqualified from the fifth round at Surfers Paradise for a technical infringement. He continued racing under appeal, but the penalty was upheld and Grice lost all points gained from the final three rounds. Reigning champion Peter Brock parted company with the Holden Dealer Team before the series began and raced in a privately funded Holden Torana during the season. Colin Bond, driving a Holden Torana for the Marlboro Holden Dealer Team took victory at the opening round at Symmons Plains Raceway, and end of season wins at Adelaide International Raceway and Lakeside International Raceway saw Bond move past Grice and Bob Morris on points to win the championship. 2000cc class competitor Christine Gibson, driving a factory supported Alfa Romeo 2000 GTV, led the series mid-season after taking four class wins, but had disqualification problems of her own and Bond regained the points advantage by season's end. Gibson's effort however remains to this day (2014) the best performance by a woman in Australian Touring Car Championship history.

Drivers
The following drivers competed in the 1975 Australian Touring Car Championship.

Calendar
The 1975 Australian Touring Car Championship was contested over a seven-round series with one race per round.

Classes
Cars competed in two classes:
 Up to and including 2000cc
 Over 2000cc

Points system
Championship points were awarded on a 9–6–4–3–2–1 basis for the first six positions in each class at each round. Bonus points were awarded on a 4–3–2–1 basis for the first four outright positions at each round.

Championship results

References

Australian Touring Car Championship seasons
Touring Car Championship